Cache Valley is a valley in Cache County, Utah and Franklin County, Idaho in the United States.

Cache Valley may also refer to:

 Cache Valley Railroad, a defunct Arkansas railroad
 Cache Valley virus, a member of the order Bunyavirales